Salem Ould Habib (born 6 April 1964) is a Mauritanian freestyle wrestler.

Habib competed for Mauritania at the 1988 Summer Olympics in the 74 kg freestyle wrestling event, he lost both opening group matches so didn't advance to the next round.

References

External links
 

1964 births
Living people
Olympic wrestlers of Mauritania
Wrestlers at the 1988 Summer Olympics
Mauritanian male sport wrestlers